Ted Chiricos was an American criminologist and the William Julius Wilson Professor of Criminology at Florida State University.

Early life and education
Chiricos received a bachelor in Sociology from Merrimack College in 1963, a masters in sociology from University of Massachusetts Amherst in 1965 and a Ph.D. in sociology from University of Massachusetts Amherst in 1968.
Chiricos passed away on November 7, 2022 after a long battle with cancer.

References

Year of birth missing (living people)
Living people
Florida State University faculty
American criminologists
University of Massachusetts Amherst College of Social and Behavioral Sciences alumni
Merrimack College alumni